Mount Nelson is a mountain located near the west branch of Lynx Creek in Jasper National Park, Alberta, Canada.

The mountain was named in 1952 by J. Monroe Thorington after an American climber with the last name of Nelson. Nelson had died in a climbing accident in The Bugaboos and the name was suggested by the first ascent party.

The first ascent was made in 1951 by Dale Ebersbacher, Frances Ebersbacher, Gil Roberts, Chuck Wilts, and Ellen Wilts.

See also 
 List of mountains in the Canadian Rockies

References

Three-thousanders of Alberta
Winston Churchill Range
Mountains of Jasper National Park